The 2006 Holy Cross Crusaders football team was an American football team that represented the College of the Holy Cross during the 2006 NCAA Division I FCS football season. Holy Cross finished third in the Patriot League. 

In their third year under head coach Tom Gilmore, the Crusaders compiled a 7–4 record. Dan Adams, Casey Gough, Frank Herlihy and Chris Nielsen were the team captains.

The Crusaders outscored opponents 275 to 235. Their 4–2 conference record placed third in the seven-team Patriot League standings. 

Holy Cross played its home games at Fitton Field on the college campus in Worcester, Massachusetts.

Schedule

References

Holy Cross
Holy Cross Crusaders football seasons
Holy Cross Crusaders football